Da Lam Tserenchimed (1869 – 1914) was a prominent lama and early 20th century Mongolian independence leader. In December 1911, he was appointed interior minister and de facto prime minister in the Bogd Khan's first government of Autonomous Mongolia, a position he held until Tögs-Ochiryn Namnansüren officially became the first prime minister in July 1912.

Early life and career

Tserenchimed was born in 1869 in present-day Khövsgöl Province.  He entered a monastery at an early age, became a lama, and then started work as low level clerk in the office of the Shamzudba (the Secular Affairs Administration office) of the estates of the Bogd Khan Ikh Shav), quickly climbing his way up to become Da Lam (Chief Lama or Abbot).  He showed a talent for politics early on and established excellent working relations with local political officials.  Around this time he began to support calls for Mongolian independence.

In July 1911 Tserenchimed was one of several high-ranking lamas and hereditary princes summoned to Khüree (present day Ulaanbaatar) by the Bogd Khan to discuss independence.  The Bogd Khan then named him a member of a delegation, along with Namnansüren, that traveled to Saint Petersburg to seek Czarist Russian and West European support for Mongolian independence from Chinese rule.

In November 1911 he was named head of General Administration Office of Khalkh Affairs in the provisional Mongolian government set up as Qing Dynasty collapsed in China.  The only commoner in Bogd Khan's government, he was then appointed interior minister in the first government of the newly established Autonomous Mongolia in early 1912, a position that was recognized as a de facto prime ministry, until the establishment in July 1912 of office of prime minister and appointment of Namnansüren to the position.

Tserenchimed had established close ties to the Chinese Kuomintang nationalists and the Japanese.  In 1913 he attempted to travel to Tokyo to seek Japanese recognition of Mongolian independence and assistance in uniting northern and southern Mongolians but was turned back at Harbin by Russian officials.

In 1914 he was removed from his position as minister of interior and reassigned to be minister for pacification of western frontier.  He died a short while later while traveling out to the western frontier to take up his new position.

Notes

History of Mongolia
1869 births
1914 deaths
People from Khövsgöl Province
Prime Ministers of Mongolia